The Deputy Prime Minister of Solomon Islands is the Solomon Islands' secondary Head of Government appointed by the Prime Minister of the Solomon Islands.

Since 1 November 2019, the Deputy Prime Minister of the Solomon Islands has been Manasseh Maelanga MP.

He has previously served as Deputy Prime Minister from 27 August 2010 to 11 November 2011 and from 22 November 2011 to 8th September 2014.

See also
 Prime Minister of Solomon Islands
 National Parliament of Solomon Islands

References

Government of the Solomon Islands
Deputy prime ministers